Sex trafficking in Malaysia is human trafficking for the purpose of sexual exploitation and slavery that occurs in Malaysia. Malaysia is a country of origin, destination and transit for sex trafficking. 

Sex trafficking victims in the country are from all ethnic groups in Malaysia and foreigners. Children, people in rural areas and or poverty, minorities, migrants, and refugees are vulnerable. Malaysian citizens, primarily women and girls, have been sex trafficked into other countries in Asia and different continents. Many are forced into prostitution and or marriage and unfree labour.  Victims are threatened and experience physically and psychologically abuse. They contract sexually transmitted diseases from rapes. Some are coerced to be in online pornographic films. The perpetrators are often part of or collude with criminal syndicates. They increasing use the internet to deceive victims.

The government of Malaysia has been criticized for its response to sex trafficking. Corruption and impunity are pervasive. Officials and police have been complicit in trafficking. Law enforcement have also failed to recognize victims and other indications of trafficking, and have treated cases as immigration violations. Though some anti-trafficking efforts, such as public service announcements, are carried out, progress has been limited by poor border management, weak victim protections, inadequate law enforcement practices, low convictions, and other factors.

References 

Prostitution in Malaysia
Women in Malaysia
Malaysian women
Youth in Malaysia
Society of Malaysia
Human rights abuses in Malaysia
Malaysia